The Stadtpark und Botanischer Garten Gütersloh (15.5 hectares) is a municipal park with botanical garden (3 hectares) located at Parkstraße, Gütersloh, North Rhine-Westphalia, Germany. It is a member of the European Garden Heritage Network and open daily without charge.

The park was created between 1906 and 1909 to designs by garden architect Friedrich Wilhelm Schoedder (1855-1938), with the botanical garden added to its northeastern corner in 1912. A palm house was constructed in 1938 but destroyed in World War II; it has subsequently been restored and now houses a café. A rose garden was created in 1941, followed by a birch grove (1950), mini golf course (1960), orchard (1990), herb garden (1998), and sculpture garden (2000).

Today the park retains its original design, broadly patterned upon an English landscape park, with an elongated axis, wide curving paths, lawns, and numerous trees, as well as a meadow flooded for ice-skating in the winter. The botanical garden is laid out as a display garden, with geometric pools, arcades, and high hornbeam hedges. The orchard contains a number of heritage fruit varieties including Westfälischer Gülderling and Schöner aus Wiedenbrück.

See also 
 List of botanical gardens in Germany

References 
 Matthias E. Borner, Daniela Tomann, Ab in die Botanik. Parkführer Stadtpark und Botanischer Garten Gütersloh, Vox Rindvieh, Gütersloh, 2017
 Doris Schulz, Entstehung, Entwicklung und Erweiterung des Volksparks in Gütersloh, Universität/Gesamthochschule Paderborn, Abt. Höxter (Diplomarbeit), 1990/91.
 Stadt Gütersloh, Gütersloher Grün. Ein Streifzug durch Parks und Grünanlagen zum 100. Stadtpark-Jubiläum, 2009

External links
 Stadtpark und Botanischer Garten Gütersloh
 Landschaftsverband Westfalen-Lippe (with maps)
 European Garden Heritage Network entry
 Garten Landschaft OstWestfalenLippe entry

Gutersloh, Stadtpark und Botanischer Garten
Gutersloh, Stadtpark und Botanischer Garten
Gütersloh